Zbigniew Stanisław Tłuczyński (born 16 February 1956 in Skierniewice) is a former Polish handball player who competed in the 1980 Summer Olympics.

In 1980 he was part of the Polish team which finished seventh in the Olympic tournament. He played all six matches and scored 14 goals.

External links
profile 

1956 births
Living people
Polish male handball players
Handball players at the 1980 Summer Olympics
Olympic handball players of Poland
Vive Kielce players
People from Skierniewice
Sportspeople from Łódź Voivodeship